Stanislav Hudzikevych; Stanislav Gudzikevich (born 7 March 1978), is a Ukrainian (until 2014) and Russian football coach and a former midfielder. He is an assistant coach with Sevastopol.

Personal life
In 2014, after the annexation of the Crimea to Russia, he received a Russian citizenship as Stanislav Gudzikevich.

External links 

 Stats on Sevstopol club (Rus)

1978 births
Living people
People from Mohyliv-Podilskyi
Ukrainian footballers
FC Obolon-Brovar Kyiv players
FC Sevastopol players
FC Mariupol players
FC Arsenal-Kyivshchyna Bila Tserkva players
MFC Mykolaiv players
Naturalised citizens of Russia
Russian footballers
Association football midfielders
FC Sevastopol (Russia) players
FC Sevastopol (Russia) managers
Ukrainian football managers
Sportspeople from Vinnytsia Oblast